Todd Mundt (born May 17, 1970) is an American former professional National Basketball Association player.  He played college basketball at Delta State University and University of Memphis. He was a 7'0" center.

In 1995-96, Mundt played for the Boston Celtics and Atlanta Hawks.

He is currently a territory manager at Atrium Medical, a Knoxville, Tennessee-area company that sells medical devices.

References

External links
 NBA stats @ basketballreference.com

1970 births
Living people
American expatriate basketball people in Australia
American men's basketball players
Atlanta Hawks players
Basketball players from Iowa
Boston Celtics players
Centers (basketball)
Delta State Statesmen basketball players
Memphis Tigers men's basketball players
Newcastle Falcons (basketball) players
Rockford Lightning players
Sportspeople from Iowa City, Iowa
Undrafted National Basketball Association players
Wollongong Hawks players